Warlincourt-lès-Pas is a commune in the Pas-de-Calais department in the Hauts-de-France region of France.

Geography
The river Kilienne finds its source in the woodland surrounding the village.

History
The commune was awarded the Croix de Guerre on 23 September 1920.

Population

Places of interest
 The church of St.Kilien, dating from the nineteenth century.
 Traces of an old castle.
 St.Kilien's chapel.

See also
Communes of the Pas-de-Calais department

References

External links

 A website about the village

Warlincourtlespas